Martine Zuiderwijk (born February 11, 1984 in Naaldwijk) is a Dutch former figure skater. She is a four-time Dutch national silver medalist and qualified to the free skate at two ISU Championships – the 2001 World Junior Championships in Sofia, Bulgaria, and 2006 European Championships in Lyon, France. She announced her retirement in late January 2007.

Programs

Results
JGP: Junior Grand Prix

References

External links
 

1984 births
Living people
Dutch female single skaters
People from Naaldwijk
Sportspeople from South Holland
20th-century Dutch women
21st-century Dutch women